Emilio Hector Rodriguez (born September 26, 1950, in Sancti Spíritus, Cuba) is a Cuban-American artist. His current work is abstract painting and fine art photography. He resides in Miami, Florida, USA. Rodríguez was born in the colonial village of Sancti Spíritus, Cuba, in 1950. His family moved to La Habana in 1953. He started drawing and experimenting with oil paint and tempera at the age of 12. While a student at the Instituto Pre-Universitario de Marianao (Marianao Senior High School), he participated in several workshops sponsored by San Alejandro Arts Academy.

Biography
Rodriguez began painting with acrylic guided by the Cuban painter Dominica Alcántara in 2005 at the “Latin Quarter Cultural Center” in Miami. Abstract painting became his last interest and passion. He has been painting abstracts since 2007.

In 2010 Emilio Héctor presented a group of abstract artists to commemorate a Century since the first abstract artwork by Wassily Kandisnsky. This presentation later continued to become the “7 Plus One Art Project” which has been presenting abstract art exhibitions in diverse institutions such as Miami Dade College, the Koubek Center, Saint Thomas University and the Miami Hispanic Cultural Arts Center

In 2014 Emilio Héctor was invited to become a member of The Cuban American Phototheque Foundation in recognition of his work in the field of photography.

Awards
. Premio de Honor (Honorable Prize): Artistes del Món - BCM Art Gallery - Barcelona, Spain (2013).
. Mención de Honor (Honorable Mention): Muestra Internacional de Arte de Gijón - Sala Aristas - Gijón, Spain (2013).
. Special Recognition: 13th Annual Abstraction Juried Online International Art Exhibition - Omaha, Nebraska (2011)

Recognitions
. Certificate of recognition for his important contribution to the community and Spanish culture: Real Liga Naval Española - Miami (2018).
. Prize "El Arcangel Dorado" 2018: PFA TV PRODUCTIONS - Miami (2018).
. Diploma of recognition for his contribution to Caritate Magazine as photographer and interviewer: APOGEO Fundation and CARITATE magazine - Miami (2017).

References
. CONVERSANDO CON EL ARTISTA PLÁSTICO CUBANOAMERICANO EMILIO HÉCTOR RODRÍGUEZ (FUNDADOR Y DIRECTOR DE “7 PLUS ONE ART PROJECT” EN MIAMI) by Patricio E. Palacios, BAQUIANA Revista Literaria, AÑO XX / Nº 109 – 110, Miami, January - June 2019.
. AD LIBITUM. EMILIO HÉCTOR RODRÍGUEZ. ART EMPORIUM GALLERY OF MIAMI. by Vivian Perez, MFA, NAGARI (digital magazine), Miami, October 2016.
. Ad LIBITUM, en cubano, “como quiera”. by Adis Rodriguez Castro, Art OnCuba (The Cuban visual arts magazine. A novel, ground-breaking project, providing diverse viewpoints about Cuban art made on and off the island). La Habana, Cuba, September 21, 2016.
. ABSTRACION EN LA GALERIA SARDIÑAS. by Adis Rodriguez Castro, Art OnCuba (The Cuban visual arts magazine. A novel, ground-breaking project, providing diverse viewpoints about Cuban art made on and off the island). La Habana, Cuba, January 20, 2016.
. COSMOPOLITISMO Y ESPIRITUALIDAD EN LA MUESTRA DE PINTOR MIAMENSE EN ST. THOMAS UNIVERSITY. by Elena Iglesias, EL NUEVO HERALD, Miami, USA, December 14, 2014.
. THE LATIN NETWORK FOR THE VISUAL ARTS (LNVA). by Emilio Hector Rodriguez, NAGARI VOL 10, 2014 (digital magazine), Miami, USA, October 2014.
. EL DIA INTERNACIONAL DE LA TIERRA. Un evento artístico presentado por el FIU Honors college. by Emilio Hector Rodriguez, NAGARI (digital magazine), Miami, USA, June 2014.
. Unos 45 artistas peruanos y extranjeros exponen obras en Surco. El Comercio Perú / El Dominical, Lima, Perú, April 22, 2014.
. 7 PLUS ONE ART PROJECT - El sincretismo del arte by Emilio Hector Rodriguez, NAGARI VOL 4, 2014 (digital magazine), Miami, USA, April 2014.
. Gallery at West Inaugurates Exhibition by Miami-based Artist Emilio Hector Rodriguez by Jesus Manuel Rojas Torres, WUM (What's up Miami) An online journal for the arts, Miami, USA, January 30, 2014 
. Cuban Artist Emilio Hector Rodriguez at IBAEM 2013 by Jesus Manuel Rojas Torres, WUM (What's up Miami) An online journal for the arts, Miami, USA, May 27, 2013.
. Emilio Héctor Rodríguez... Un pintor de realidad abstracta by Diana Montaño, writer/journalist, Huffington Post (digital magazine), USA, Dec. 26, 2012.
. ENTREVISTA AL PINTOR EMILIO HECTOR RODRIGUEZ by Maria Espinoza, PhD, writer/journalist/speaker, SUB-URBANO (digital magazine), Miami, USA, -Nov. 1, 2012.
. Our star this month - Emilio Hector Rodriguez by Dena Rabadi, journalist, BLUE LINE (digital magazine),  Dubai, United Arab Emirates - Jul., 2012.
. Emilio Héctor Rodríguez. La pintura como vocación, la vida como prueba: by Milagros Gonzalez, journalist, La Patilla USA, (digital magazine), Venezuela-USA - Jul. 17, 2012.
. REAL ABSTRACTIONS en el Miami Dade College West Campus by Milagros Gonzalez, journalist, La Patilla USA  (digital magazine), www.lapatilla.com, Venezuela-USA - Feb. 26, 2012.

American artists
Cuban emigrants to the United States
Living people
University of Havana alumni
1950 births